{{DISPLAYTITLE:T1 space}}

In topology and related branches of mathematics, a T1 space  is a topological space in which, for every pair of distinct points, each has a neighborhood not containing the other point.  An R0 space is one in which this holds for every pair of topologically distinguishable points.  The properties T1 and R0 are examples of separation axioms.

Definitions
Let X be a topological space and let x and y be points in X. We say that x and y are  if each lies in a neighbourhood that does not contain the other point.
 X is called a T1 space if any two distinct points in X are separated.
 X is called an R0 space if any two topologically distinguishable points in X are separated.

A T1 space is also called an accessible space or a space with Fréchet topology and an R0 space is also called a symmetric space. (The term  also has an entirely different meaning in functional analysis. For this reason, the term T1 space is preferred. There is also a notion of a Fréchet–Urysohn space as a type of sequential space. The term  also has another meaning.)

A topological space is a T1 space if and only if it is both an R0 space and a Kolmogorov (or T0) space (i.e., a space in which distinct points are topologically distinguishable). A topological space is an R0 space if and only if its Kolmogorov quotient is a T1 space.

Properties

If  is a topological space then the following conditions are equivalent:

 is a T1 space.
 is a T0 space and an R0 space.
Every finite set is closed.
For every  the fixed ultrafilter at  converges only to 

If  is a topological space then the following conditions are equivalent: (where  denotes the closure of )

 is an R0 space.
Given any  the closure of  contains only the points that are topologically indistinguishable from 
For any   is in the closure of  if and only if  is in the closure of 
Every neighbourhood of a point  contains 
Every open set is a union of closed sets.
For every  the fixed ultrafilter at  converges only to the points that are topologically indistinguishable from 

In any topological space we have, as properties of any two points, the following implications

    

If the first arrow can be reversed the space is R0. If the second arrow can be reversed the space is T0. If the composite arrow can be reversed the space is T1. A space is T1 if and only if it is both R0 and T0.

A finite T1 space is necessarily discrete (since every set is closed).

A space that is locally T1, in the sense that each point has a T1 neighbourhood (when given the subspace topology), is also T1.  Similarly, a space that is locally R0 is also R0.  In contrast, the corresponding statement does not hold for T2 spaces.  For example, the line with two origins is not a Hausdorff space but is locally Hausdorff.

Examples 
 Sierpinski space is a simple example of a topology that is T0 but is not T1, and hence also not R0.
 The overlapping interval topology is a simple example of a topology that is T0 but is not T1.
 Every weakly Hausdorff space is T1 but the converse is not true in general. 
 The cofinite topology on an infinite set is a simple example of a topology that is T1 but is not Hausdorff (T2). This follows since no two open sets of the cofinite topology are disjoint.  Specifically, let  be the set of integers, and define the open sets  to be those subsets of  that contain all but a finite subset  of  Then given distinct integers  and :
 the open set  contains  but not  and the open set  contains  and not ;
 equivalently, every singleton set  is the complement of the open set  so it is a closed set;
so the resulting space is T1 by each of the definitions above. Alternatively, the set of even integers is compact but not closed, which would be impossible in a Hausdorff space.

 The above example can be modified slightly to create the double-pointed cofinite topology, which is an example of  an R0 space that is neither T1 nor R1.

 The Zariski topology on an algebraic variety (over an algebraically closed field) is T1.  To see this, note that the singleton containing a point with local coordinates  is the zero set of the polynomials   Thus, the point is closed.  However, this example is well known as a space that is not Hausdorff (T2).  The Zariski topology is essentially an example of a cofinite topology.
 The Zariski topology on a commutative ring (that is, the prime spectrum of a ring) is T0 but not, in general, T1. To see this, note that the closure of a one-point set is the set of all prime ideals that contain the point (and thus the topology is T0). However, this closure is a maximal ideal, and the only closed points are the maximal ideals, and are thus not contained in any of the open sets of the topology, and thus the space does not satisfy axiom T1.
 Every totally disconnected space is T1, since every point is a connected component and therefore closed.

Generalisations to other kinds of spaces
The terms "T1", "R0", and their synonyms can also be applied to such variations of topological spaces as uniform spaces, Cauchy spaces, and convergence spaces.
The characteristic that unites the concept in all of these examples is that limits of fixed ultrafilters (or constant nets) are unique (for T1 spaces) or unique up to topological indistinguishability (for R0 spaces).

As it turns out, uniform spaces, and more generally Cauchy spaces, are always R0, so the T1 condition in these cases reduces to the T0 condition.
But R0 alone can be an interesting condition on other sorts of convergence spaces, such as pretopological spaces.

See also

Citations

Bibliography

 A.V. Arkhangel'skii, L.S. Pontryagin (Eds.) General Topology I (1990) Springer-Verlag .
 
  
 Lynn Arthur Steen and J. Arthur Seebach, Jr., Counterexamples in Topology. Springer-Verlag, New York, 1978. Reprinted by Dover Publications, New York, 1995.  (Dover edition).
 

Properties of topological spaces
Separation axioms